The Les Humphries Singers was a 1970s pop group formed in Hamburg, Germany in 1969 by the English-born Les Humphries. The group had several chart hits in Germany and in other European countries. 

The Les Humphries Singers dissolved at the end of the 1970s and Humphries moved back to England.

Members
Les Humphries was born John Leslie Humphreys on 10 August 1940 in Croydon, Surrey, England. In 1969 he formed the group in Hamburg, Germany. 

The group consisted of a large number of singers of diverse ethnic origin, some of whom such as John Lawton also performed with other groups. Another member was Jürgen Drews, who later started a long-running solo career, starting with his 1976 hit in Germany, "Ein Bett im Kornfeld", a cover version of "Let Your Love Flow" by The Bellamy Brothers. Linda Thompson (born 21 September 1948 as Linda Übelherr), who had previously been a member of the Cornely Singers and Love Generation, was a member from 1973 to 1974, and later joined Silver Convention, and had a solo career as Linda G. Thompson, sang as a duo with Jerry Rix, and later joined The Hornettes. Henner Hoier (born 19 April 1945), who was a member from 1970 to 1971, had been a member of the Rivets from 1964 to 1968 and of the Rattles from 1968 to 1970. From 1972 onwards, he had a solo career, and from 1988 to 1993 he was a member of the Rattles and from 1994 of the Rivets. He has also composed and produced music, and appeared in the musical Only You.

Additional members included Liz Mitchell, later front woman with Boney M., and John Lawton, who also sang for the German progressive/hard rock band Lucifer's Friend and would go on to be the frontman for Uriah Heep.

In 1974 Les Humphries Singers starred in the German movie Es knallt - und die Engel singen  directed by Roberto Leoni (as Butch Lion) and produced by Dieter Geissler Filmproduktion.

Humphries died on 26 December 2007 in Basingstoke, England from a heart attack after a severe bout of pneumonia.

Former members
Les Humphries (1969–80) (died 26 December 2007)
Jimmy Bilsbury (1969–77, 1982, 1992)
John Lawton (1971–76) (died 29 June 2021)
Earl Jordan (1972–76, 1982)
Barry St. John (1972–73)
Jürgen Drews (1969–??)
Victor Scott (1970–76, 1982, 1992) (died 10 May 2020)
Christopher Yim (1971–76, 1992)
Peggy Evers (1970–76)
Judy Archer (1970–76)
Elvira Herbert (1972–75) (died 8 March 1980)
Dave O'Brien (1973–76)
Sheila McKinlay (1973–75, 1982, 1992)
Enry David-Fascher (1970–72)
Myrna David (1971–72) 
Malcolm Magaron (1970–72)
Claudia Schwarz (1974–76)
Emily Woods-Jensen (1974–76, 1992)
Dornée Edwards (1970–71)
Maddy Verhaar (1975–76)
Lil Walker
Don Adams (1974–75)
Tina Kemp-Werner (1970–74)
Barbara Johnson
Gail Stevens (1974)
Goldy Kloen-Evert (1970–71)
Irene Bendorf (1971)
Renate Andersen-Bilsbury (1974–76, 1982)

Musical background and style
The Les Humphries Singers performed a mix of popular music and gospel covers and had some success in Europe with this approach. Much like contemporary disco act Boney M., their music focused on Rhythm and blues, gospel, and disco, but often with psychedelic phasing or flanger effects on solos and bridges, and, much like James Last, much larger background choruses in the studio to emulate a live atmosphere. The Les Humphries Singers at the time brought something from the flair of the hippie movement into contemporary German-produced (but English-sung) pop music, especially due to their mixed ethnic background and peculiar fashion sense.

Hits and later reunions 

Two of their earliest and best known hits were "Mexico" (1972) which was based on the 1957 Jimmy Driftwood country hit "The Battle of New Orleans", and "Mama Loo" (1973), based on "Barbara Ann" by The Beach Boys. On later albums by the Les Humphries Singers "Mexico" was released with different lyrics, most likely due to copyright problems (plagiarism). In 1976 they represented Germany at the Eurovision Song Contest with the Ralph Siegel title "Sing Sang Song", reduced to only six singers (their usual line-ups consisted of 20 performers and up), and came in 15th place, which they regarded as their beginning of the end as a band. (They were initially the runner-up in the national final behind Tony Marshall who was later disqualified) At the same time, they were the resident vocal band on the internationally syndicated TV series "The International Pop Proms", working with James Last and other renowned artists.

They disbanded shortly thereafter the same year, but enjoyed a short comeback as a pure live act from 1991 until 1993 performing their old hits.

In 2006, the original band members formed "The Original Singers" without Humphries, but with new members Chris Dakota, David Tobin, Jay Jay van Hagen and Willi Meyer, re-recording their old hits and also releasing new material. This reincarnation totally lacked the hippie feel and look.

The former members, Jürgen Drews, Tina Kemp-Werner, Judy Archer and Peggy Evers-Hartig, formed a group called the "Les Humphries Singers Reunion" in 2009.

Discography

Filmography
 1974 - Es knallt - und die Engel singen directed by Roberto Leoni (as Butch Lion)
 2008 - Die Les Humphries Singers - Aufstieg Und Fall Einer Poplegende directed by Andreas Fischer

References

External links

Extensive Discography

 

1969 establishments in West Germany
1980 disestablishments in West Germany
Musical groups from Hamburg
Eurovision Song Contest entrants for Germany
Eurovision Song Contest entrants of 1976
Musical groups established in 1969
Musical groups disestablished in 1980